daphne is an Indigenous artist-run centre located in the city of Montreal, dedicated to contemporary First Nations, Métis and Inuit art.

History 
Indigenous artists Nadia Myre, Skawennati, Hannah Claus and Caroline Monnet founded the centre in 2020. It is named in honor of the Odawa-Potawatomi artist Daphne Odjig, and it is the first Indigenous artist-run centre in the province of Quebec. 

In the Fall of 2020, Lori Beavis was hired as daphne’s first director. She describes the mission of daphne as being a gathering place, which centres the work of Indigenous artists.

References 

Artist-run centres